"Nobody" is a song by American heavy metal band Avenged Sevenfold. It was released on March 14, 2023, as the lead single from their eighth studio album, Life Is but a Dream.... It is the band's first new song since the release of "Mad Hatter" in 2018.

Promotion and release 
The release of "Nobody" was preceded by a countdown video on YouTube set for its release at 8 a.m. PT on March 14, 2023. The countdown video was unlocked by fans after completing an online scavenger hunt created by the band in order to tease new material. The release of "Nobody" coincided with the announcement of Life Is but a Dream..., its corresponding album. "Nobody" was accompanied by a music video, which was uploaded to YouTube the same day as the single release, where it amassed over 500,000 views in the first 24 hours and rising No. 1 on trending videos on YouTube. The video was directed by Chris Hopewell, and is entirely in stop motion.

Personnel 
Avenged Sevenfold
M. Shadows – lead vocals
Zacky Vengeance – rhythm guitar, backing vocals
Synyster Gates – lead guitar, backing vocals
Johnny Christ – bass, backing vocals
Brooks Wackerman – drums

Technical personnel
 Joe Barresi – production
 Andy Wallace – mixing
 Wes Lang – cover art

References 

Avenged Sevenfold songs
2023 songs
2023 singles